Buriram ('city of happiness') is a town (thesaban mueang) in Thailand, capital of Buriram Province, about  northeast of Bangkok. The town occupies tambon Nai Mueang of Mueang Buriram District. In 2012 it had a population of 27,862.

History

Almost a thousand years ago, the present-day Buriram was part of the Khmer Empire. Ruins from that time attest to its destruction. The most significant of them is on an extinct volcano and is protected in the Phanom Rung Historical Park. According to inscriptions found, Buriram's ruler recognized the hegemony of the Khmer Empire's emperor. Before the ascent of Bangkok, little was known about Buriram. In the early Bangkok Period, in the early-19th century, the town originally called Muang Pae was renamed Buriram. After administrative reforms in the late 19th century, Buriram was incorporated into Siam as a province.

Administration divisions 

There are 18 chumchons (villages) in Buriram.

Geography 

Buriram is in the centre of Buriram Province. Buriram has no significant waterways. It has a creek, Huai Chorakhe Mak, the Buriram moat (or Khlong Lalom), Nong Prue, and Huai Chorakhe Mak and Huai Talat reservoirs.

Infrastructure

Communications 
Buriram has a post office, TOT, the national telecom company, a CAT office and two radio stations: Radio Thailand AM and Radio Thailand FM.

Electricity 
All of the houses in Buriram area (6,097 in total) have access to electricity. The Buriram Provincial Electricity Authority (Buriram PEA) is the main supplier.

Water supply 
There are 6,097 houses which use municipal water in Buriram. Total consumption is 18,000-19,000 cubic meters a day. Huai Chorakhe Reservoir is the source of Buriram's water. Huai Talat Reservoir is the reserve water supply.

Health 
The main hospital in Buriram is Buriram Hospital, operated by the Ministry of Public Health.

Climate

Weather

Economy

The bulk of the local economy is agricultural and the tourist industry that is a prominent feature in much of the rest of the country has yet to make a significant impact. Key agricultural crops include rice and cassava. The main languages spoken in Buriram are central Thai, Lao, and Khmer.

Sports 

Buriram has a football club, Buriram United F.C., which plays at Chang Arena.

The construction of top-tier racetrack Chang International Circuit started in March 2013 and opened on 4 October 2014. The track is an FIA Grade I certified circuit, suitable for Formula One racing, and hosted a Japanese Super GT round in 2014. From 2018 on, the circuit will host MotoGP for the first time. It also hosts rounds of the World Superbike Championship (WSBK). Other racetracks are being planned, such as a motocross circuit.
The Buriram Marathon, a silver label class event, is held in January every year. Over 25,000 participants are expected in 2023. 

In 2013, Newin Chidchob, developer of the Buriram's new CIC F1 racetrack, has said that, "Buriram doesn't have the sea like Pattaya, doesn't have mountains like Chiang Mai, so we will make Buriram the city of sports."

Transport

Airports
Buriram Airport is the only airport in Buriram Province. Thai AirAsia serves Buriram from Don Mueang International Airport (DMK).

Highways
Highways 218, 219, 226, and 2074 pass through Buriram.

Intercity transit

The State Railway of Thailand (SRT), the national rail system, provides service from the Buriram Railway Station. Buriram is on the northeastern railway line.

The national bus company, The Transport Co., Ltd., operates a bus depot at Buriram Bus Station. Nakhonchai Air has its bus terminal adjacent to the bus station.

Demography 
As of 30 April 2010.
 Male 13,555
 Female 14,620

Total population of 28,283 and 6,097 family units.

Education

References

External links

Buriram Times

Populated places in Buriram province
Cities and towns in Thailand
Isan